Teleconversion may refer to:

 changing a telephone number on a line to another number
 use of a teleconverter lens on a camera